Surgical Remission/Surplus Steel is an EP by English death metal band Carcass. The EP consists of songs recorded during the sessions for previous album Surgical Steel and was released on 11 November 2014 through Nuclear Blast.

Release and promotion
The band announced Surgical Remission/Surplus Steel with an entry on their official Facebook web presence on 15 September 2014. The song "Livestock Marketplace" was presented to the public as video clip shortly before the EP came out. The EP was released on 11 November 2014 in North America, 14 November in Europe and 17 November in the United Kingdom. Nuclear Blast issued Surgical Remission/Surplus Steel in different physical formats and as digital version. The CD edition came as regular jewelcase and digipak while the 10" vinyl was made available in different colours.

Carcass went on North American tour titled "Inked in Steel" in October and November 2014 to promote Surgical Remission/Surplus Steel. They were accompanied by supporting bands Obituary, Macabre, Exhumed and Noisem.

Track listing

Personnel

Carcass
 Jeff Walker – lead vocals, bass guitar, additional art
 Bill Steer – guitar, vocals
 Dan Wilding – drums
 Ben Ash – guitar

Technical personnel
 Colin Richardson – production
 Andy Sneap – mixing, mastering
 Carl Bown – engineering, mixing (5)
 Rob Kimura – album art, layout
 Ian T. Tilton – original photography
 Mircea Gabriel Eftemie – additional art
 Martin Nesbitt – original "tools" concept

References

2014 EPs
Carcass (band) EPs
Nuclear Blast EPs